"Wish I Had An Angel" is the ninth single by Finnish symphonic metal band Nightwish, the second from their fifth album Once. The song features vocals by then-vocalist Tarja Turunen and bassist Marko Hietala. The song was still performed live after Turunen's departure with Anette Olzon, before her departure, and current vocalist Floor Jansen afterwards.
Featured on the soundtrack of the film Alone in the Dark, it became the group's most popular single in Europe and in the United States, next to "Nemo". It made it onto two U.S. film soundtracks. It reached #60 in the UK Singles Chart, the highest of any of the band's singles in the UK.

Track listing
All tracks are written by Tuomas Holopainen, except "Where Were You Last Night" written by Norell Oson Bard.

 "Wish I Had an Angel" – 4:06
 "Ghost Love Score" (orchestral version) – 10:47
 "Where Were You Last Night" (Ankie Bagger cover) – 3:52
 "Wish I Had an Angel" (demo) – 4:08

Personnel
Tarja Turunen – lead vocals
Tuomas Holopainen – keyboard and piano
Emppu Vuorinen – guitars
Jukka Nevalainen – drums
Marko Hietala – bass, backing vocals
London Philharmonic Orchestra - Orchestra and chorus

Video
Directed by Uwe Boll, "Wish I Had an Angel" was the last video from Once and it features some scenes from the 2005 movie Alone in the Dark, also directed by Boll. An alternate version omits the film's footage, due to the immense negative reception of the said film.

Live performances
Wish I Had an Angel is the second most played song by Nightwish, with well over 500 times, as of January 2023.  During Once and Dark Passion Play tours it was always the last song performed.

Charts

Sales and certifications

References

External links
Nightwish's Official Website

2004 singles
Nightwish songs
Male–female vocal duets
Number-one singles in Finland
Songs written by Tuomas Holopainen
2004 songs
Spinefarm Records singles